

Administrative and municipal divisions

References

 
Jewish Autonomous Oblast